The 2021 Chinese Women's Football League, officially known as the 2021 China Taiping Chinese Football Association Women's Football League for sponsorship reasons, was the 7th season in its current incarnation. In this season, all matches were held at the Dalian Youth Football Training Base, Dalian, Liaoning. It began on 27 July 2021 and concluded on 24 October 2021. In this season, the number of clubs was expanded from 7 to 11.

Clubs

Club changes

To Football League
Clubs promoted from 2020 Chinese Women's League Two
 Shanghai Qiusheng Donghua
 Qingdao Huanghai
 Tianjin Shengde

Clubs relegated from 2020 Chinese Women's Super League
 Hebei China Fortune

From Football League
Clubs promoted to 2021 Chinese Women's Super League
 Sichuan

Name changes
 Guangzhou Evergrande Taobao changed their name to Guangzhou.
 Hebei China Fortune changed their name to Hebei

Stadiums and locations

League table

Results

Positions by round

Results by match played

Goalscorers

Top scorers

Top assists

References

External links
Official Website (Desktop view)
Official Website (Mobile view)

2021
2020–21 domestic women's association football leagues
2021–22 domestic women's association football leagues
+